, is a Japanese anime television series produced by A-1 Pictures and Aniplex and directed by Atsushi Matsumoto. The 13-episode anime aired in Japan on the TV Tokyo television network starting April 5, 2010. Senkō no Night Raid is the second project of Anime no Chikara. Sentai Filmworks acquired the series and released it on Blu-ray and DVD in August 2011. Sentai Filmworks' license for the series later expired in 2018.

Premise
The year is 1931. The location is Shanghai, China. The Imperial Japanese Army has been dispatched to mainland China due to the relatively recent First Sino-Japanese War, Russo-Japanese War, and World War I. In this cosmopolitan city of intrigue, there is a special military spy organization called Sakurai and their deeds which are buried in history will be revealed.

Characters

Sakurai organization

A lively, optimistic young man with a great sense of justice, who tends to act rashly and impulsively. To hide his identity as a spy, Aoi runs a photo studio together with Kazura. He has a telekinetic ability, which allows him to manipulate objects and people around him, and requires only that he is able to see the object he intends to affect. While it proves to be useful for situations such as dodging bullets, it appears to have a time limit on the duration of use from the moment he begins to use the ability. He is proficient in Chinese, Russian, German and English and used to study in Europe where he picked up a more liberal outlook on life. He also plays the violin, but not on the professional level.

A man with a great sense of pride and honor, which often brings him into conflicts with Aoi. His strict manners and conservative personality are reflective of his descent from a samurai family. Kazura's ability is teleportation; he is reluctant to use his powers unless absolutely necessary, as he believes that his power gives him an unfair advantage against his opponents. His ability has limitations: Kazura must envision the location he wants to teleport to, and is also limited to the number of teleports he can make within a short period of time. While Kazura aspires to enter the Imperial Japanese Army, in which he gains a lot of recognition, he is pulled out from the military and is forced to join Sakurai because of his ability. Kazura is fluent in Chinese, German and English and is skilled in aikijutsu.

A stern yet quietly earnest man, Natsume was born to a family of poor farmers. In his youth, he used to work as a servant at a garden treehouse, where he learned of his psychic ability for the first time. He serves Yukina with genuine faithfulness. In public, they have a formal relationship to keep up appearances, but otherwise they treat each other as equals. He has clairvoyance, which is useful for surveillance, and excels during moonlit nights. He also acts as the group's sniper.

A mild-mannered young woman with a solemn, introspective personality, Yukina is the sole female member of the group and comes from a noble family. Upon hearing the news regarding her brother's disappearance, she joins Sakurai Kikan in order to locate his whereabouts. She can telepathically communicate with her teammates, allowing her to act as the coordinator of the group, and seems to have psychometric abilities, which can also be used in conjunction with Natsume and Aoi's abilities. Her abilities can be sharpened by the smell of flowers, especially lilies.

A supervisor from Sakurai Kikan and a former Imperial Japanese Army lieutenant colonel. He is the one who usually gives mission briefings to the group. He is a mild-mannered gentleman and speaks in a polite tone. Aoi describes him as a sly person.

Antagonists

Yukina's older brother. He was an artillery second lieutenant of the Kwantung Army but disappeared without a trace along with the platoon he was in charge of in Manchuria, forcing Yukina to search for him. It is revealed that he has been acting in accordance to his own take on Pan-Asianism and becomes the enemy of Sakurai Kikan.  Like his sister, he also has telepathic abilities but much stronger than hers to the point of using it to knock his targets unconscious.

Isao's subordinate, assigned to pick up Yukina upon Isao's orders. When Yukina does not arrive at the rendezvous point, Kuse tests Sakurai Kikan by bomb threats. He also has the ability of telepathy and teleportation, but his teleportation ability is limited to a set number of fixed locations. His uniform implies that he is an infantry second lieutenant.

A physicist involved the development of nuclear weapons for Isao's organization.  However, despite Isao's plans to achieve Pan-Asianism with the threat of mass destruction, Ichinose is unable to create an actual working atomic bomb, struggling over the mathematical formula required for the detonation mechanism.

Other

 A girl who works in a Chinese restaurant near the photo studio where Aoi and Kazura work. She is loud, boisterous and straight-forward. She is Chinese, but speaks Japanese fluently.

Aoi's fiancée, who he believed to have died. She also skilled in playing the violin and is the one who taught Aoi on how to play. She is known as "the Prophet" by the Japanese officials, due to her ability of foresight. As a result, she fakes her death to Aoi and abandons her former life in order to bear the responsibility of helping guide rulers in every generation.  Isao's fiancée, was Shizune's immediate predecessor as the "Prophet".

A rapier-thin man with a crinkly mop of hair who always wears a black coat and fedora hat. He is often seen with Shin'ichirou Sakurai, but his position is unknown. No details about him are certain at first, except that he has the supernatural ability to erase the memories of a person by touching them. With this ability, he erased the memories of a lost girl Aoi saved from a bomb attack.

Anime

Reception

Carl Kimlinger of Anime News Network found the story reminiscent of Ian Fleming's works, being in the pulp espionage genre, which he regarded as being a refreshing change from other anime series. Theron Martin felt the story seemed like a "particularly strong addition" to the "super powered secret spy" genre, and commended the attention to details in using Chinese dialogue, but felt the musical score did not always work with the show. Hope Chapman enjoyed that the stunts in the anime did not seem "implausible", and enjoyed the setting. Tim Maughan compared the show to Ghost in the Shell: Stand Alone Complex, and felt the exposition to be difficult to follow at times.  Maughan enjoyed the "convincing noir atmosphere" and "exhilarating" action scenes. Rebecca Bundy felt that the first episode wasted time on exposition and did not build a picture of the relationships between the characters. Christopher Macdonald felt it had "a lot of potential".

References

External links
  
 Senkō no Night Raid at TV Tokyo 
 

2010 anime OVAs
2010 anime television series debuts
A-1 Pictures
Anime with original screenplays
Aniplex franchises
Espionage in anime and manga
Espionage television series
Sentai Filmworks
Fiction set in 1931
Fiction set in the 1930s
Fiction about bomb disposal